"Po dangum" is a song recorded by Lithuanian recording artist Monika Linkytė. It was written and produced by Leon Somov and Jazzu for her debut studio album Walk With Me (2015).
It is most-watched song in Lithuanian language on YouTube platform, as of September 2019 it has more than 21 million views.

Awards and nominations

References 

2015 singles
Lithuanian songs
2015 songs